The  was a series of battles in 1584 between the forces of Hashiba Hideyoshi (who would become Toyotomi Hideyoshi in 1586) and the forces of Oda Nobukatsu and Tokugawa Ieyasu. Hideyoshi and Ieyasu had both served Oda Nobunaga and had not previously come into conflict; this would in fact be their only period of enmity. Although this episode of history is most commonly known by the two largest and most important battles, the event is also sometimes referred to as the Komaki Campaign (小牧の役 Komaki no Eki).

Background
In 1583, at the Battle of Shizugatake, Hideyoshi supported Nobukatsu, the second son of Oda Nobunaga, and defeated Shibata Katsuie, who supported Nobunaga's third son, Nobutaka. After winning the battle, Hideyoshi invited Nobukatsu and other generals to his residence at Osaka Castle, which he had just completed that same year. The meaning of such an invitation was for all the men to pay homage to Hideyoshi, which would reverse the roles between Hideyoshi and Nobukatsu. Therefore, Nobukatsu broke his bonds to Hideyoshi and did not go to Osaka Castle. Hideyoshi offered reconciliation to three of Nobukatsu's chief retainers (Tsugawa Yoshifuyu, Okada Shigetaka and Azai Nagatoki), which led to rumors that they were all in support of Hideyoshi. This in turn led Nobukatsu to become suspicious of the three men, whom he ordered executed on the sixth day of the third month. These actions gave Hideyoshi the justification for attacking Nobukatsu and, as a result, Nobukatsu asked Tokugawa Ieyasu for auxiliary forces. The next day, when Ieyasu sent his forces out to battle, it became a battle between Hideyoshi and Ieyasu.

Battle events
The first of these battles was fought around Mount Komaki and gave rise to the name "Battle of Komaki". The rest of the battles took place around Nagakute, giving rise to the modern-day names "Battle of Nagakute" for the conflict.

Battle of Haguro

On the thirteenth day of the third month, Ieyasu arrived at Kiyosu Castle. On that same day, warriors of the Oda clan's vassals who were led by Ikeda Tsuneoki switched to the side of Hideyoshi and took over Inuyama Castle, which had originally been built by Oda Nobunaga. Ieyasu was upset upon hearing this news and rushed to Inuyama Castle, arriving two days later.

At the same time, Mori Nagayoshi (brother of Mori Ranmaru, who died at the Incident at Honnō-ji with Nobunaga) began his attempt for the Kiyosu Castle. Despite fierce arquebus fire from Mori's men, Sakai Tadatsugu succeeded at flanking and attacking Mori's in the rear. Mori Nagayoshi fled, having suffered 300 casualties.

On the sixteenth day of the month, forces called to support Inuyama Castle arrived in Haguro. Ieyasu, however, had already known of these plans and had Sakai Tadatsugu and Sakakibara Yasumasa move 5,000 troops to Haguro that same evening. Early the following morning, Tadatsugu's troops launched a surprise attack on Nagayoshi, whose troops barely escaped after the onslaught.

On the eighteenth day of the month, without fear of raids from enemies, Ieyasu took over Inuyama Castle and finished the defenses that had first been built up by Hideyoshi.

Mission to Mikawa

Hideyoshi and his troops left his fortifications at Osaka Castle on the 21st day of the month, arriving at Inuyama Castle on the 27th day, and in Gakuden (present-day Inuyama) on the fifth day of the fourth month.

Ieyasu, between entering Komaki Castle and arriving in Gakuden, stayed away from battle, except for a few smaller skirmishes here and there. Hideyoshi was lulled into complacency by this situation, aided by Tsuneoki, who said to him, "Ieyasu is now in Komakiyama. He is away from his main base in Okazaki and if we were to move our arms against him, we will certainly win."

The ambitious Hideyoshi decided to set out for Mikawa, along with the support of Mori Nagayoshi (who had regained his reputation at the Battle of Haguro), Ikeda Tsuneoki (who was embarrassed by his daughter's marriage), Hori Hidemasa and the young Hidetsugu (17 years old at the time). 
Hidetsugu was able to amass 8,000 men, which were supported by Hori Hidemasa's 3,000 men, Mori Nagayoshi's 3,000 men and Tsuneoki's 6,000 men. On the following day, they all set out for Mikawa.

Battle of Iwasaki Castle

The Battle of Iwasaki was fought between the forces of Ikeda Tsuneoki and the Iwasaki castle garrison led by Niwa Ujitsugu. Though it was just part of overall Battle of Komaki and Nagakute, it played an important role in the outcome.

On the seventh day of the fourth month, Ieyasu learned of Hidetsugu's encampment at Shinogi (modern-day Kasugai) through the information provided by farmers in Iga Province. Ieyasu entered into Obata Castle (Moriyama-ku, Nagoya) the following day and chose to pitch camp for the evening. Early the next morning, he sent both Ōsuga Yasutaka and Sakakibara Yasumasa forces to chase after Toyotomi Hidetsugu's forces, and followed shortly thereafter with his own. Hidetsugu resumed his march on the eight day after hearing of Ieyasu's entrance to Obata Castle, but on the next morning, the situation changed very rapidly.

Ikeda Tsuneoki led the attack on Iwasaki Castle (modern-day Nisshin) and was promptly shot off from his horse. Embarrassed by his fall, Tsuneoki forgot about the hit-and-run tactics and started a full assault on the castle. Though the defenders fought well, the castle fell. Niwa Ujitsugu, suffered numerous casualties including 300 killed, Ujitsugu's brother Niwa Ujishige being among the dead.

Battle of Hakusanmori
At the time that Ikeda Tsuneoki was attacking Iwasaki Castle, Hidetsugu, Hidemasa and Nagayoshi moved their forces to Hakusanmori (the modern-day cities of Owariasahi, Nagakute) to rest their forces, but Tokugawa forces were closing in on them. Later, Hidetsugu forces were ambushed bu Ōsuga Yasutaka and Sakakibara Yasumasa. Hidetsugu's forces were pretty much destroyed by Tokugawa's surprise attack. Hidetsugu himself was knocked from his horse, but was able to get another horse and escape. It was at this battle that many members of the Kinoshita family (including Sukehisa, the father of Hideyoshi's wife, Nene) died.

Battle of Hinokigane
Following the battle of Hakusanmori, the Tokugawa fortified Mount Komaki, creating a stalemate there. Thus, Ikeda Tsuneoki, one of Toyotomi Hideyoshi's chief commanders, decided to begin raids through neighboring Mikawa Province with an army numbering 20,000. Ieyasu expected this and led Tokugawa troops to challenge  Hideyoshi's forces.  Mizuno Tadashige led Tokugawa's rearguard against Ikeda's force and the noise of the battle alerted Hori Hidemasa, the head of one of Hideyoshi's divisions.  Hori Hidemasa led his men to the defense of his comrades, taking up position in the village of Nagakute. He held off the initial Tokugawa attacks, but was forced to withdraw as the main body of the Tokugawa army arrived, numbering some 9,000 warriors.

Battle of Nagakute

Mori Nagayoshi, another of Hideyoshi's commanders, waited until Tokugawa moved in to support Ii Naomasa, so that he could flank them. However, Tokugawa forces charged forward, rather than swinging around, and avoided the flanking maneuver. Mori Nagayoshi was shot off his horse, which demoralized Ikeda's force. Ii Naomasa commanded around three thousand musketeers with distinction and defeated the forces led by Ikeda Tsuneoki. Ikeda's head was taken soon afterwards, and despite Hideyoshi's arrival with reinforcements, Ieyasu decided to withdraw, unwilling to risk further casualties, and returned to Komaki.

Hideyoshi heard the news of Ieyasu's departure shortly thereafter, and on the tenth day of the fourth month, he left Gakuden; he arrived back to Osaka castle on the first day of the fifth month.

Aftermath
When news of the loss at the Battle of Hakusanmori arrived in the afternoon, the 20,000 troops of Hideyoshi rushed to Ryūsen-ji, near the battle site. Later that evening, when he heard that Ieyasu was staying at Obata Castle, he decided to assault it the next morning; however, during that time, Ieyasu had left Obata Castle, went to Komakiyama Castle and finally returned to Kiyosu Castle. Hideyoshi heard the news of Ieyasu's departure shortly thereafter and, on the tenth day of the fourth month, left Gakuden; he arrived back at Osaka castle on the first day of the following month.

On the 16th day of the sixth month, Takigawa Kazumasu attacked Ieyasu's Kanie Castle, but was driven back by Oda Nagamasu. As a result, Kazumasu had his responsibilities taken from him and removed from Ieyasu's group.

On the ninth day of the ninth month, Sassa Narimasa, at the behest of Ieyasu, attacked Suemori Castle in Noto Province, forcing out its resident; later Maeda Toshiie arrived in the middle of the night, and defeated the Sassa forces.

Though Ieyasu had gained the advantage in both engagements, Hideyoshi and Ieyasu did make peace with each other in the early part of 1585. In the words of George Sansom, "...both men were too sensible to waste strength on a foolish quarrel."

National Historic Site
The  in the city of Nagakute was designated a National Historic Site of Japan in 1939. The designation includes Mount Mihata (御旗山), Mount Irogane (色金山), and the head mound (首塚)  It is about a 3-minute walk from Nagakute Kosenjō Station on the Linimo maglev line.

Names for the battle
During the Edo period, the public records of the Tokugawa clan and the shogunate refer to these battles as Battle of Komaki (小牧陣 Komaki no Jin). However, there are also documents that refer to it as the Battle of Iwasakiguchi (岩崎口の戦い Iwasakiguchi no Tatakai). There are places where the fighting in Nagakute is called the Battle of Nagakute (長久手合戦 Nagakute Gassen), but the two battles have generally been merged into one. Many other names have also been used to describe these battles, some of which separate the two, while the others keep them together. During the Meiji Restoration, the various Japanese words for battles, campaigns, etc., were mostly unified, leading to it sometimes being called the Komaki and Nagakute Campaign (小牧・長久手の役 Komaki-Nagakute no Eki). Through all of this, though, "Battle of Komaki and Nagakute" has come to be the accepted name.

See also
Ikeda Sen
List of Historic Sites of Japan (Aichi)

References

Komaki and Nagakute 1584
1584 in Japan
Komaki and Nagakute
Historic Sites of Japan
Nagakute, Aichi
Owari Province